Legislative Assembly elections were scheduled to be held in Meghalaya on 27 February 2023 to elect all 60 members of the Meghalaya Legislative Assembly. The votes were counted and the results were declared on 2 March 2023.

Background 
The tenure of 10th Meghalaya Assembly is scheduled to end on 15 March 2023. The previous assembly elections were held in February 2018. After the election, a coalition led by the National People's Party formed the state government, with Conrad Sangma becoming Chief Minister.

Schedule

The election schedule was announced by the Election Commission of India on 18 January 2023.

Parties and alliances









Others

Candidates

Issues

Separate state demands 
Meghalaya state regional parties such as GNC and HSPDP demanded separate state for Garo Hills and Khasi-Jaintia Hills respectively.

Campaigns

National People's Party
The National People's Party launched its campaign on 23 January 2023 in Adokgre, North Garo Hills district. Meghalaya chief minister & NPP national president Conrad Sangma termed the TMC an outsider party in Meghalaya and said that TMC leaders were ready to leave their party after the election.

Manifesto

 Creation of 5 lakh jobs over the next five       years.

 Special focus on entrepreneurship, tourism, agro-processing and knowledge/digital sectors in both the urban and rural areas of the state.

 Skilling of youths through the creation of multi-sectoral skill parks, exposure trips and livelihood sectors.

 Creation of 1,000 Chief Minister's Facilitation Centers to deliver government services to every village.

 Affordable Drug Centers have been planned to provide affordable medicines to the people.

All India Trinamool Congress
The All India Trinamool Congress supremo Mamata Banerjee launched the party's campaign on 18 January 2023 in Mendipathar of North Garo Hills district. Banerjee slammed the MDA government, dubbing it a proxy government from Delhi and also Guwahati, in a veiled reference to Assam chief minister Himanta Biswa Sarma. She also praised the Trinamool government in Bengal.

Manifesto
TMC manifesto promises 3 lakh jobs in 5 years, with a monthly allowance of Rs. 1000 for unemployed youth aged 21-40 under MYE scheme.
 Rs. 10,000 annual financial assistance to farmers (under Farmer Assistance for Rural Meghalaya)
The manifesto promises job cards and a monthly transfer of Rs 1000 to female tourism workers and households through the MFI WE scheme.
The TMC manifesto promises e-ration cards, financial assistance to farmers, social security, maternal and child care centers, medical facilities, piped drinking water, road upgrades and better healthcare services.
Focussing on the health sector, the manifesto promised Maternal and Child Care centres in every block to provide efficient parental and post-natal services. The manifesto has also promised the recruitment of specialist doctors, the establishment of new Medical Colleges, and ensuring quality tertiary healthcare facilities.
On the civic amenties front, the TMC has promised facilitation of Piped drinking water connections to all households. All the 6,459 villages of the state will be connected with black topped motorable roads and the manifesto has promised the upgradation of major arterial roads.

Indian National Congress 
Manifesto
 Monthly assistance of Rs 3000 to single below poverty line (BPL) mothers.
 A job for every household.
 Drug and corruption-free state along with a transparency law. Opening of 50 new de-addiction centres statewide.
 Uninterrupted power supply.
 Uploading of all government files related to development and infrastructure for public scrutiny.

Incidents
On 25 January 2023, Congress Member of District Council (MDC) from Mawkyrkat, Carness Sohsang claimed that the TMC offered him and 5 other Congress MDCs crores of rupees to leave Congress and join TMC. He also alleged that the NPP-UDP coalition had attempted to poach Congress MDCs previously as well.

Surveys & Polls 
Election Commission of India has banned exit polls for the period between 7am on 16 February to 7pm on 27 February, 2023.

Results

Results by parties

Results by division

 * Election was not held in one seat

Results by district

 *Election was not held in one seat

Results by constituency

Government formation
NPP chief Conrad Sangma gave resignation from the post of Chief Minister to Governor Phagu Chauhan. He staked claim government with support of 32 MLAs (26 NPP, 2 BJP, 2 HSPDP, and 2 Independents). But soon later in the evening, HSPDP withdrew their support which reduced the NPP- led MDA tally to 30. The opposition parties with 29 MLAs counter claimed to form a United Front. Leaders of TMC, Congress, PDF, HSPDP, VPP had meeting with UDP leader Lahkmen Rymbui to form alternative government barring MDA alliance consists NPP and BJP. Later UDP, PDF and HSPDP pledged support to NPP-BJP-Independent MDA alliance.

See also 
2023 elections in India
Elections in Meghalaya

References 

State Assembly elections in Meghalaya
Meghalaya
2023 State Assembly elections in India